Fisnik Asllani (born 8 August 2002) is a German professional footballer who plays as a forward for Bundesliga club 1899 Hoffenheim.

Club career
Asllani at the age of six began playing football with the academy of BFC Dynamo in 2008, where after eight years it was transferred to Union Berlin.

On 29 June 2020, Asllani signed his first professional contract with 1899 Hoffenheim after agreeing to a four-year deal. On 15 December 2020, he made his debut with second team in a 2–0 home win against Eintracht Stadtallendorf after coming on as a substitute at 59th minute in place of Maximilian Beier. His senior debut with 1899 Hoffenheim came on 20 November 2021 in a league match against RB Leipzig after coming on as a substitute at 89th minute in place of Ihlas Bebou.

International career

Kosovo
On 20 March 2019, Asllani was named as part of the Kosovo U17 squad for 2019 UEFA European Under-17 Championship elite round. Five days later, he made his debut with Kosovo U17 in a match against Ukraine U17 after being named in the starting line-up.

On 15 October 2019, Asllani was included in Kosovo U19's extended squad for 2020 UEFA European Under-19 Championship qualifications. He was, however, not included into the final squad.

Germany
On 7 December 2019, Asllani was named as part of the Germany U18 squad for a winter tournament in Israel. Three days later, he made his debut with Germany U18 in a match against Serbia U18 after being named in the starting line-up and scored his side's only goal during a 1–2 away defeat.

Personal life
Asllani was born in Berlin, Germany to Kosovo Albanian parents from the village Sharban of Pristina.

References

External links

Bundesliga profile

2002 births
Living people
Footballers from Berlin
Association football forwards
German footballers
Germany youth international footballers
German people of Kosovan descent
German people of Albanian descent
Kosovan footballers
Kosovo youth international footballers
Regionalliga players
TSG 1899 Hoffenheim II players
Bundesliga players
TSG 1899 Hoffenheim players